Man Called Invincible (also known as They Called Him the Player with the Dead, In the West There Was a Man Named Invincible and Tricky Dicky) is a 1973 Italian Spaghetti Western-comedy film directed by Giuliano Carnimeo.

Cast 

George Hilton: Tresette 
Chris Huerta: Bamby
Evelyn Stewart: Miss Marlene
Umberto D'Orsi: McPearson
Tony Norton: Veleno 
Nello Pazzafini: Aureola Joe
Rosalba Neri: Concettina
Sal Borgese: Salvatore

Reception 
The film received mixed reviews. Christian Kessler praised the decor and the cinematography of the film, so that "this crackling-shards-comedy looks relatively good". Achille Valdata was ambivalent: "The name of the village, Melabacata (i.e. Septic Apple), gives an idea of the humorous intentions of this film" for which gags are "often amusing, in other cases end in themselves."  The website Lexikon des Internationalen Films marked the film as "stupid".

References

External links

1973 films
Spaghetti Western films
Films directed by Giuliano Carnimeo
Films scored by Bruno Nicolai
1970s Western (genre) comedy films
1973 comedy films
1970s Italian films